Thomas Loftus Cole (1877 – 7 March 1961) was a unionist politician in Northern Ireland.

Cole studied at the Sullivan Upper School in Holywood before qualifying as a pharmacist.  Despite this, he worked as a property developer, and was elected to Lurgan Urban District Council in 1911, serving until 1917.  He return to politics in 1931, winning a seat on the Belfast Corporation for the Ulster Unionist Party, which he held until 1958.  He was High Sheriff of Belfast in 1937 and Deputy Lord Mayor of Belfast in 1938–1939.  He stood in Belfast Pottinger at the 1933 and 1938 Northern Ireland general elections, but was not successful.

At the 1945 general election, Cole was elected for Belfast East.  He made no speeches in Parliament, and stood down at the 1950 election.  He also held the seat of Belfast Dock in the Northern Ireland House of Commons from 1949 until he lost the seat in 1953.

In reference to whether the name of Northern Ireland should be changed to Ulster, Cole remarked in 1949 that the British Government had refused to allow the name change "because the area did not comprise the nine counties of the province. We should demand our three counties [Donegal, Monaghan and Cavan] so that we could call our country Ulster, a name of which we are all proud".

References

External links 
 

1877 births
1961 deaths
High Sheriffs of Belfast
Members of Belfast City Council
Ulster Unionist Party members of the House of Commons of Northern Ireland
Members of the House of Commons of Northern Ireland 1949–1953
Members of the Parliament of the United Kingdom for Belfast constituencies (since 1922)
UK MPs 1945–1950
Ulster Unionist Party members of the House of Commons of the United Kingdom
Members of the House of Commons of Northern Ireland for Belfast constituencies
Ulster Unionist Party councillors